Moyencharia mineti is a moth of the family Cossidae. It is found in southern Chad and probably also the Central African Republic. The habitat consists of a mosaic of riparian forests, open woodland and wooded floodplain grassland at low elevations.

The wingspan is about 20 mm for males and 32 mm for females. The forewings are warm buff. Both sexes have a slightly different wing pattern. The hindwings are buffy olive, but olive ochre towards the base of the wing.

Etymology
The species is named for Professor Dr Joël Minet.

References

Moths described in 2013
Moyencharia
Insects of the Central African Republic
Insects of Chad
Moths of Africa